Spring of Life is a 2000 Czech film directed by Milan Cieslar.

Plot 
The film depicts a little-known operation of the Nazi SS, started just before the outbreak of World War II.
Grétka  (Monika Hilmerová) has been selected by the Nazis for the Lebensborn. She falls in love with a Jew, Leo (Michał Sieczkowski), who has been hiding there.

Cast 
 Monika Hilmerová : Grétka 
 Michał Sieczkowski: Leo
 Johana Tesarová : Klára
 Vilma Cibulková : Waage
 Karel Dobrý : Odillo
 Bronislav Poloczek : Kasuba
 Josef Somr : Teacher

External links
 

2000 films
2000 drama films
Czech drama films
Films about race and ethnicity
Nazi eugenics
Films about Nazi Germany
Czech war drama films
Czech World War II films
2000s Czech films